Pseudolestes mirabilis is a species of damselfly. As a result of molecular phylogenetic studies by Bybee et al. in 2021, its monotypic genus Pseudolestes is now in its own family, Pseudolestidae.

References

Monotypic Odonata genera
Zygoptera genera
Calopterygoidea